The Larut dwarf gecko (Hemiphyllodactylus larutensis) is a species of gecko. It is endemic to Peninsular Malaysia. It is sometimes considered conspecific with Hemiphyllodactylus harterti.

References

Hemiphyllodactylus
Reptiles of Malaysia
Endemic fauna of Malaysia
Reptiles described in 1900
Taxa named by George Albert Boulenger